Mian Mahalleh-ye Golrudbar (also Romanized as Mīān Maḩalleh-ye Golrūdbār; also known as Gelrūdbār, Gil-i-Rudbar, Gol Roodbar, Golrūdbār, Gul-i-Rūdbār, and Kolrūdbār) is a village in Baz Kia Gurab Rural District, in the Central District of Lahijan County, Gilan Province, Iran. At the 2006 census, its population was 503, in 145 families.

References 

Populated places in Lahijan County